Radivoj Korać (5 November 1938 – 2 June 1969) was a Serbian and Yugoslav professional basketball player. He represented the Yugoslavia national basketball team internationally. Korać is well-known for holding the EuroLeague's all-time single-game scoring record (since 1958), at 99 points scored, in a game versus Alviks, during the 1964–65 season, and for once making 100 out of 100 free throws on a live television show in Belgium.

Korać died in a car crash in 1969, at the age of 30, and FIBA Europe later established the European-wide third-tier level FIBA Radivoj Korać Cup, in his remembrance, in 1971. Korać was named one of FIBA's 50 Greatest Players in 1991. In 2002, the Basketball Federation of FR Yugoslavia named its top national domestic cup competition, the Radivoj Korać Cup, after him. He was enshrined into the FIBA Hall of Fame in 2007, and was named one of the 50 Greatest EuroLeague Contributors the following year.

Club career
Korać was born in Sombor, in the Kingdom of Yugoslavia. He started playing for OKK Beograd, at the age of 16, and played as a left-handed forward-center. Popularly nicknamed, Žućko ('Ginger'), he became one of the best, if not the best, player of the Yugoslav First Federal League in the 1960s. In 1960, Korać was named The Best Athlete of Yugoslavia, and Yugoslav Sportsman of the Year. He was the best scorer of the Yugoslav First Federal League for seven seasons, which was a record. He scored a total of 5,185 points, in 169 games played in the Yugoslav League, for a career scoring average of 30.7 points per game. In 1962, in a Yugoslav First Federal League game against Mladost Zagreb, Korać scored 74 points.

With OKK Beograd, he won four Yugoslav League titles. Korać also played in multiple FIBA European Champions' Cup (EuroLeague) competitions with OKK Beograd. Korać was named a part of the best European selection, in both 1964 and 1965. In a two-game playoff series against Swedish League champions Alviks, during the 1964–65 season of the FIBA European Champions' Cup (EuroLeague), he scored 170 points. He scored 71 points in the first game of the series, and 99 points in the second game of the series, for a series scoring average of 85 points per game. He averaged 54.8 points per game that season, which is the highest single-season scoring average in the EuroLeague's history, since 1958.

Korać's career scoring average in the EuroLeague was 43.6 points per game. He was also the best scorer in the Belgian League in 1968, while playing with Standard Liège, and the Italian League's best scorer in 1969, while playing with Padova.

National team career
Korać entered into the senior Yugoslavian national basketball team in 1958, and went on to win five silver medals, and one bronze medal with them, in a total of 157 international games. He was the EuroBasket's Top Scorer 4 times (1959, 1961, 1963, 1965), and was named the MVP of EuroBasket 1961. He also won the silver medal at both the 1963 FIBA World Championship, and the 1967 FIBA World Championship.

He was the Top Scorer of the 1960 Summer Olympic Games, and he won the silver medal at the 1968 Summer Olympic Games. With Yugoslavia's senior men's national team, he scored 3,153 points in 157 games played, for a scoring average of 20.1 points per game. He was the leading scorer in the 1960 games.

Personal life
Away from the basketball court, Korać enjoyed theatre, music, and reading books. He was a senior undergraduate, from the Faculty of Electrical Engineering (ETF), at the University of Belgrade. Surprisingly, he once turned down a contract offer to play with Red Star Belgrade.

Death and legacy
On Monday 2 June 1969, Korać died in a car crash, just outside of Sarajevo, on the road between Vogošća and Semizovac. The Yugoslav Basketball Federation decided that no basketball games would be played in Yugoslavia, on 2 June again. He is interred in the Alley of Distinguished Citizens in the Belgrade New Cemetery.

In 1971, FIBA Europe established the FIBA Radivoj Korać Cup. After the third-tier level European-wide Cup folded in the year 2002, the Basketball Federation of Serbia and Montenegro renamed its national domestic cup competition to Radivoj Korać Cup, a name it still carries today in Serbia.

In popular culture 
 In 2011, Serbian biopic and semi-documentary film, Ginger: More Than a Game, Korać is portrayed by Vladimir Aleksić. The film tells the story of his life.
 In 2015, Serbian sports drama, We Will Be the World Champions, Korać is portrayed by Dejan Dedić. Dedić also reprised his role in the 2016 Serbian TV series Prvaci sveta.

See also
 List of basketball players who died during their careers
 List of Yugoslav League annual scoring leaders
 List of Yugoslav League career scoring leaders
 List of players in the Naismith Memorial Basketball Hall of Fame
 List of members of the FIBA Hall of Fame
 FIBA Korać Cup
 Radivoj Korać Cup

Notes

References

External links
 OKKBelgrade Hall Of Fame - Official Web Site of OKKBelgrade*
 FIBA Hall Of Fame Page On Korać
 Euroleague.net 50 Greatest Contributors
 FIBAEurope.com Profile
 Сећање на легендарног стрелца (The memory of the legendary shooter ), RTS, June 1, 2009 
 Radivoj Korac's 99 points
 101 Greats: Radivoj Korac

1938 births
1969 deaths
Sportspeople from Sombor
Basketball players at the 1960 Summer Olympics
Basketball players at the 1964 Summer Olympics
Basketball players at the 1968 Summer Olympics
Burials at Belgrade New Cemetery
Centers (basketball)
FIBA Hall of Fame inductees
Medalists at the 1968 Summer Olympics
Olympic basketball players of Yugoslavia
Olympic medalists in basketball
Olympic silver medalists for Yugoslavia
OKK Beograd players
Pallacanestro Petrarca Padova players
Power forwards (basketball)
Road incident deaths in Bosnia and Herzegovina
Road incident deaths in Yugoslavia
Serbian men's basketball players
Serbian expatriate basketball people in Belgium
Standard BC Liège players
Yugoslav men's basketball players
1963 FIBA World Championship players
1967 FIBA World Championship players